Kathryn Alexandra McDowell,  (born 19 December 1959) is a British classical musician and businessperson. Since 2005, she has been the managing director of the London Symphony Orchestra.

Honours
In 2009, McDowell was appointed a Deputy Lieutenant (DL) to the Lord Lieutenant of Greater London. In the 2011 Queen's Birthday Honours, she was appointed a Commander of the Order of the British Empire (CBE) "for service to music".

References

External links

British classical musicians
London Symphony Orchestra
1959 births
Living people
Commanders of the Order of the British Empire
Deputy Lieutenants of Greater London